Joseph Neil MacNeil (April 15, 1924 – February 11, 2018) was a Canadian prelate of the Catholic Church.

MacNeil was born in Sydney, Nova Scotia, and was ordained a priest on May 23, 1948. MacNeil was appointed bishop of the Diocese of Saint John, New Brunswick, on April 9, 1969, and consecrated on June 24, 1969.  MacNeil was appointed bishop of the Archdiocese of Edmonton on July 2, 1973 until his resignation on June 7, 1999. He died after a stroke on February 11, 2018, at the age of 93.

See also
Robert Jacobson

References

External links
Catholic-Hierarchy
Edmonton Archdiocese
St John (NB) Diocese

1924 births
2018 deaths
20th-century Roman Catholic archbishops in Canada
People from Sydney, Nova Scotia
Roman Catholic bishops of Saint John, New Brunswick